This List of hospitals in Togo contains the name, location, type, owner, and coordinates for hospitals in Togo.  There were 207 medical facilities in Togo in 2019.  The types of public medical facilities include Régional (3), Préfectoral (31), and Universitaire (3) hospitals, as well as 77  Centre Médico-social and Unité de Soins Périphérique medical facilities.  There are several faith-based hospitals in Togo.

Hospitals
The hospitals in Togo are listed below, including name, city, Region, type, ownership, coordinates, and references.

References

 List of hospitals in Togo
Hospitals
Togo
Togo
Hospitals